The road hierarchy categorizes roads according to their functions and capacities. While sources differ on the exact nomenclature, the basic hierarchy comprises freeways, arterials, collectors, and local roads. Generally, the functional hierarchy can more or less correspond to the hierarchy of roads by their owner or administrator.

The related concept of access management aims to provide access to land development, while ensuring traffic flows freely and safely on surrounding roads.

General classification

Controlled-access highway 

At the top of the hierarchy in terms of traffic flow and speed are controlled-access highways; their defining characteristic is the control of access to and from the road, meaning that the road cannot be directly accessed from properties or other roads, but only from specific connector roads. This indirection, in conjunction with high speed limits and multiple lanes, allows these roads to support fast traffic flow with high volume, in both urban and rural areas. They are at the bottom of the hierarchy in terms of access to property, allowing access to almost nothing besides other roads and rest areas.

They are also known as freeways in the U.S., South Africa, and parts of Australia; as motorways in the U.K., New Zealand, and parts of Australia; and as expressways in numerous countries.

Controlled-access highways do not have traffic signals nor at-grade crossings with other roads (intersections), railways, or pedestrian paths. When a road's path would intersect a controlled-access highway, a flyover (US: overpass or underpass) will vertically separate the two roads, preventing the need for an intersection. Pedestrian footbridges and tunnels are also grade-separated. The opposing directions of travel are separated by a central reservation (UK) or median strip (US) generally a few meters to a few dozen meters wide, which may consist of a traffic barrier or a natural barrier like grass. This separation makes controlled-access highways a subset of dual carriageways (UK) or divided highways (US). Generally, these roads prohibit pedestrians and vehicles not powered by a motor (e.g., bicycles). Parking is also generally prohibited.

Highway systems 

In many countries, the controlled-access highways form an expansive system that generally connect distant cities within the country to each other, but there are often more highways that only have local courses designed to improve connections in a smaller region, such as within a metropolitan area. Controlled-access highways are often given numbers to form a national highway system, such as the Bundesautobahn in Germany or the Interstate Highway System in the United States, but note that a national highway system may also consist of other numbered highways that are not implemented as controlled-access highways. Some countries may have more than one national highway system of a lower rank, such as the U.S. Highways (not to be confused with the Interstate system), only portions of which run on controlled-access highways. Conversely, there may also be controlled-access highways not part of a numbered system. Highways are usually given icons featuring the number of the highway called highway shields or route markers. In addition to the national highway system, there may be provincial-level or state-level (US) highway systems of a lower rank, which need not consist mainly of controlled-access highways.

Slip roads (UK) or ramps (US) are special connector roads that allow traffic access to and from a controlled-access highway. Their length is normally on the order of several hundred meters in order to allow vehicles a sufficient distance to safely change speed while transferring from one road to the other road. The course of a ramp is often curved as needed in order to connect the two roads without sharp turns, which require vehicles to slow down considerably to traverse them safely. In many cases, a ramp may be subject to grade separation and use a flyover. In the US, where the standard term for a flyover is overpass (or underpass, when the road with level altitude is the higher road), the word flyover, which is less common, is reserved for those that carry ramps. Entrance ramps (or on-ramps) allow ingress traffic to enter the highway, and exit ramps (or off-ramps) allow egress traffic to exit the highway.

Ramps may be described by their orientation. A directional ramp curves toward the desired direction of travel, a semi-directional ramp exits on the side of the road opposite to the desired direction of travel, then curves back toward the desired direction, and a non-directional ramp curves away from the desired direction of travel (such as the looping ramps in a cloverleaf interchange).

The full set of ramps that connect a controlled-access highway to another road is called a grade-separated junction (UK) or interchange (US). The interchange is classified as a system interchange if traffic remains in the highway system, traveling from one controlled-access highway to another, or a service interchange if the interchange serves a local area by allowing travel between a controlled-access highway and a road without access control. The controlled-access highway is called the mainline, and the uncontrolled road is called the crossroad. More complex interchanges involving many roads may have characteristics of both types of interchanges as required.

The number of directions one can travel toward or away from the interchange on all of the roads involved is the number of "legs". When two roads meet, there are four paths to and from the interchange, and so the interchange has four legs, but if one of the roads terminates at the interchange, it will only have three legs. Interchanges with more legs require joining elements from four- and three-legged interchanges in order to permit travel from any one direction to any other direction. If all possible connections exist, it is a complete interchange providing complete access; if not, it is an incomplete interchange providing incomplete access.

Limited-access road 

A limited-access road, often called a limited-access highway (US), divided highway (US), or dual carriageway (UK), and in some situations an expressway, is similar to a controlled-access highway in that it conforms to many or most of the standards that controlled-access highways follow, but does allow some uncontrolled access to local roads. They can be viewed as a middle ground between controlled-access highways and arterial roads. The degree of isolation from local traffic varies between countries and regions, as does a precise definition of the term itself.

Controlled-access highways can also be viewed as a subset of limited-access highways that has stricter requirements.

Arterial road 

An arterial road or arterial thoroughfare is a road without controlled access that can carry a large volume of local traffic at a generally high speed, being below controlled-access highways in the hierarchy. Because their primary function is to connect collector roads (below) to controlled-access highways, some are considered limited-access roads.

Intersections of arterial roads are almost always at-grade, and use traffic signals to coordinate traffic that would otherwise intersect, but traffic signals are often omitted when minor collector roads intersect, usually placing a stop sign at the collector road to prevent the traffic on the arterial road from being impeded.

Arterial roads almost always have multiple lanes to allow for high capacity. They do not allow for access to residential properties under most circumstances.

Collector road 

A collector road, also known as a distributor road, is a road that allows high access to properties and has a low to moderate capacity and a generally low speed limit. They are below arterial roads in terms of speed and capacity, but higher in terms of access, as they can allow access to residential properties.

Collector roads can vary widely in appearance. Some urban collectors are wide boulevards entering communities or connecting sections. Others are residential streets, which are typically wider than local roads, although few are wider than four lanes. Small-scale commercial areas can be found on collector roads in residential areas. Key community functions such as schools, churches, and recreational facilities can often be found on collector roads.

A collector road usually consists of a mixture of signaled intersections, roundabouts, traffic circles, or stop signs, often in the form of four-way stops. Two-way stops are generally used at intersections with local streets that favour traffic movement on the collector.  In North America, a collector road normally has traffic lights at intersections with arterial roads, whereas roundabouts and two-way stops are more commonly used in Europe.

Speed limits are typically 20‑35 mph (30‑60 km/h) on collector roads in built-up areas, depending on the degree of development and frequency of local access, intersections, and pedestrians, as well as the surrounding area (the speed tends to be lowest in school zones). Traffic calming is occasionally used in older areas on collector roads as well.

Local road 

A local road, also called a street, is a road in a built environment that has all kinds of properties beside it which can be accessed from the road or a parking lot connected to the road. Different types of local roads include residential streets, avenues, and alleys. They have the lowest speed limits and capacities in the hierarchy, but have the highest access to property.

Local roads have at-grade intersections and have similar specifications to collector roads. Local roads may be unpaved in some cases. A common feature of local roads is driveways, which connect the road to a residential property.

United States and Canada

Freeways 
At the top of the hierarchy are limited access roads: Freeways or on- and off-ramps. These allow the freeway to operate with less friction at an even higher speed and with higher flow. Often freeways are included in the next category, arterials.

Arterials 
Arterials are major through roads that are expected to carry large volumes of traffic. Arterials are often divided into major and minor arterials, and rural and urban arterials.

In some places there are large divided roads with few or no driveways that cannot be called freeways because they have occasional at-grade intersections with traffic lights that stop traffic (expressways in California, dual carriageways in Britain) or they are just too short (superarterials in Nevada).  Such roads are usually classified as arterials.

Frontage roads are often used to reduce the conflict between the high-speed nature of an arterial and property access concerns.

Collectors
Collectors (not to be confused with collector lanes, which reduce weaving on freeways), collect traffic from local roads, and distribute it to arterials. Traffic using a collector is usually going to or coming from somewhere nearby.

Local roads
At the bottom of the hierarchy are local streets and roads. These roads have the lowest speed limit, and carry low volumes of traffic. In some areas, these roads may be unpaved.

Europe 

Most of Europe has a legal system based on European and international treaties which define at European/international level three types of road: motorways, express roads, and other roads. This vision comes from the 20th century and is limited to traffic code and legal issues. Each nation has its own Hierarchy of roads, although there is also a European road numbering at European level, for European roads.

Most of Europe has adopted Motorways (Autoroutes/Autobahnen/Autopistas/Autostrade), usually similar to those in France and the UK. The idea was originally developed in Germany, where all motorways are toll-free, and has spread widely. All major through routes in the EU and neighbouring countries have a European E-Road number in addition, or in the case of some countries' motorways, instead of a national number. In the UK, Albania, Iceland, Andorra and Cyprus these numbers are not displayed (although in Cyprus, signposted E roads indicate miscellaneous roads).

Otherwise, most other European countries have some form of differentiating between national routes, regional and inter-regional roads and other local routes.

United Kingdom

Motorway
Motorways, similar to freeways, these high-speed roads are designated with an M prefix or (M) suffix. e.g. M1, A1(M).  The speed limit is generally  and there is a hard shoulder, an often slightly narrower lane next to lane 1, which is usually only to be used in cases of an emergency.  Emergency telephones are located every mile along the route so motorists with broken-down vehicles can contact the authorities, although this is increasingly being done using mobile phones.  Signs are blue with white text for both destinations and motorway numbers.  In general, junctions are given numbers which are displayed prominently, sometimes with a letter suffix, in a small black box on all the signs for any given junction.  Junctions are generally signed one mile before they exit, with three or four further signs as the junction is reached, although on busy urban stretches this first warning can reduce to about ⅓mile.  Cyclists, pedestrians, mopeds, very slow vehicles and certain other traffic are banned.

Primary A-road
Green on maps and signs. A main recommended route these can be single track as in North West Sutherland or more usually single carriageway or dual carriageway. The primary road network is fully connected, meaning you can reach any part from any other without leaving the network.  Some of the major dual carriageway primary routes have numbered junctions or hard shoulders in the style of the Continental semi-motorways.  Many Primary Routes are largely or wholly subject to clearway restrictions, and in major cities they may be classed as red routes.  Emergency telephones, if present at all, are usually infrequent - there may be some additional telephones operated by the UK's two main motoring organisations, the RAC and the AA, but these are becoming rarer.

Non-primary A-road
Often exists where the route is important but there is a nearby primary route (A or motorway) which duplicates this road's function. Shown as red on maps, and has white signage with black lettering.  Some non-Primary A-class roads are partially subject to clearway restrictions.

B road
Regional in nature and used to connect areas of lesser importance.  Usually shown as brown or yellow on maps and have the same white signs as non-Primary A-Class routes. If the route is primary, like the B6261, then it will be shown the same as a Primary A-Class route.

C road

C roads are used as local authority designations for routes within their area for administrative purposes. These routes are not shown on small-scale road maps, but have occasionally been known to appear on road signs.

Unclassified
Unclassified roads are local roads with no defined destination.  Local destinations may, however, be signed along them.

France 

In France, one hierarchy of road is based on the owner who manages the road.
Independently of that, roads can have various specificities such as speed or crossings.

Autoroutes
Along with the rest of Europe, France has Motorways or Autoroutes similar to the British network.  Unlike in the UK, the network is mostly accessible on payment of a toll, which is usually distance-dependent; there are generally more Toll (péage) Motorways in the South of France.  However, sections passing through or close to major towns and cities are usually free.  As in the UK, destinations reached via a motorway are shown with white text on a blue background.  Junctions are usually numbered, the numbers being shown on signs in a small oval in the corner of the sign.

Route Nationale
Before the construction of Autoroutes, the Routes Nationales were the highest classification of road.  They are denoted by a route number beginning N, or occasionally, RN. Going back to a Napoleonic road classification system, these are main roads comparable with British Primary Routes.  They are maintained directly by the state and are usually the shortest route between major centres.  Many N-Class roads are dual carriageway for some or all of their length, with a few also being given the designation of semi-motorway, where junctions are grade-separated and there is a central reservation with crash barrier.  The hard shoulder, or bande d'arrêt d'urgence, is often narrower than on full motorways and there are fewer emergency telephones.

Routes Départementales
France (including overseas territory) is split into 100 departments, the second-highest tier of local government, similar to a UK county or US state.  The departments have responsibility for all roads beginning with a letter D, or occasionally RD.  These roads vary in quality, from newly built local dual carriageways and downgraded Routes Nationales to winding roads that are barely wide enough for traffic to pass.  Generally, they are quieter than the Routes Nationales, and of a reasonable standard.

Routes Communales
In general, each settlement in France is a Commune - akin to a British Civil Parish.  This most local level of government is responsible for maintaining all the local roads, which are numbered with a letter C prefix.  Except in major towns and cities, where their numbers are usually not marked on signs, they are usually single-track and may be in a state of poor repair due to the large number of roads covered by populations as small as 10.

Hungary 
Hungarian road categories are as follows:
 Gyorsforgalmi út (controlled-access highway):
Autópálya (motorway): at least 2+2 travel lanes and 1+1 emergency lane, central reservation, no at-grade intersections, speed limit: 130 km/h 
Autóút (expressway): 1+1 or more travel lanes, optionally emergency lanes and central reservation, some at-grade intersections(only if 1+1 lanes), speed limit: 110 km/h 
Főút (arterial road or main road) (with one digit in their name, e.g.: 6-os út)
Megyei út (county road) (with two digits, e.g.: 16-os út)
Helyi út (local road) (with three or more digits)
etc.

Czech Republic and Slovakia 
The road hierarchy in the Czech Republic and Slovakia originates from the Czechoslovak 1961 road act, although both countries have made changes since the dissolution of Czechoslovakia.

Motorways 
Motorways form the trunk of the road network, and similarly to other European countries they include at least 2 lanes in each direction, as well as an emergency lane on the right and auxiliary lanes for entering and leaving the motorway in intersections. In both countries, motorways use white-on-green directional signage. The general speed limit for motorways in both countries is 130 kilometers per hour, which is implicitly decreased to 80 km/h (Czech Republic) or 90 km/h (Slovakia) in urban areas.

In both Czech Republic and Slovakia, motorways are designated by a number prefixed by the letter D. Both countries also use red rectangular shields with the motorway number in both countries, although in Slovakia the shield includes the D prefix, while in the Czech Republic it only contains the number itself.

Slovakia, as well as the Czech Republic before 2016, also operates a complementary expressway network, which consists of limited access highways that don't fully meet the motorway standards. They are designated by a number prefixed by the letter R. Slovak expressways use similar highway shields as motorways, albeit with the different prefix. The term "motor vehicle road" has also been used variably to refer to the network, although in both countries this term is now used for a separate category of roads.

The same rules of the road as on motorways also apply on expressways, including the speed limits and the white-on-green signage, although they used to be legally distinct from proper motorways and instead considered to be a part of the regular highway network. This led the Czech Republic to discontinue the system in 2016, when most former expressways were upgraded to motorway status, while Slovakia passed an amendment in 2020 that redefined expressways as a type of motorway.

In both countries, all motorways and expressways are owned and maintained by the state and the use of most of their sections is paid via electronic vignettes or toll. Bypasses of large towns and other sections that are used for local traffic tend to be exempt from the vignette requirement.

Highways 
The highway network is divided into three classes, which are distinguished by the number of digits in the highway number. The class number can be optionally mentioned in written text alongside the road number, separated by a slash. First and second class roads in both countries use blue rectangular shields. Slovak third class roads use a white oval highway shield.

 First class roads are designated by an up to two-digit number and are owned by the state. Road numbers 61 and above run exclusively on Slovak territory under the original Czechoslovak numbering.
 Second class roads are designated by a three-digit number and are owned by the regions. The first digit identifies the general location of the route:
 1xx - south Bohemia
 2xx - north Bohemia
 3xx - east Bohemia, Vysočina
 4xx - Moravia and Silesia
 5xx - Slovakia
 6xx - former first class roads replaced by a motorway (Czech Republic only)
 Third class roads are also owned by the regions. In the Czech Republic, these are designated by four to five-digit numbers, where the first three digits are the number of a nearby higher class road, padded by zeroes if less than three digits. Slovakia renumbered these roads in 2015, and now uses a four digit numbering where the first three digits identify the district that the road runs in. The road numbers are not marked on most maps and road signs in the Czech Republic, however, Slovakia started doing so after the reform.

The general speed limit on highways is 90 kilometers per hour, reduced to 50 km/h in urban areas. A section of a highway can also be signed as a road for motor vehicles, which are off-limits for other kinds of traffic. The speed limit on such roads in the Czech Republic is 90 km/h for single carriageways and 110 km/h for double carriageways, reduced to 80 km/h in urban areas.

Other roads 
 Local roads are owned and managed by municipalities (all towns and cities have also status of municipalities). According to the Road Act and its implementing regulations, they should be numbered by local numbering, but such a numbering is not available to the public and really not required by the state. In reality, only street names are used for identification. Technically, local roads are distinguished to four classes similar to classes of roads (the 4th class are pedestrian or cyclist zones or paths), but the classification is used only in very specialized administration maps. statutory cities can delegate administration of low-class streets or administration of sidewalks to self-governing boroughs. 
 Utilitarian roads can be owned by any subject, private as well as public. Such roads are often subject of litigations because the legal status is a bit inconsistent and unclear. 
 Publicly accessible utilitarian roads have similar traffic mode as local roads; generally, forest roads and field roads are count among "utilitarian/purpose roads". However, motor vehicles are prohibited at the forest roads by the Forest Act. The national law doesn't concern over compensations or subventions to the owner, and the duty of maintenance is questionable and not stated explicitly by the law. 
 Closed utilitarian roads tend to be located in enclosed objects or facility; outside of them, the owner needs an administrative decision to exclude or restrict the public traffic. Traffic rules applies to such communications, but the owner can permit exceptions.

History 
Until 1938, separate lands of Czechoslovakia have different laws and road systems, inherited from the Austro-Hungarian period. Just in 1938, a unified Czechoslovak road act passed. In 1935, there existed Czechoslovak state roads (not distinguished by class) and several types of non-state public roads: 
 in Bohemia, silnice zemské (land roads), silnice okresní (district roads), silnice a cesty obecní (municipal roads and ways) (there was only one remained 23 km land road in Bohemia, connecting Jilemnice, Vysoké nad Jizerou and Rokytnice nad Jizerou)
 in Moravia, silnice okresní (district roads) of 1st and 2nd class, silnice a cesty obecní (municipal roads and ways)
 in Czech Silesia, silnice okresní (district roads) of 1st and 2nd class, silnice a cesty obecní (municipal roads and ways) and veřejné cesty interesentů (public ways of interesents)
 in Slovakia and Zakarpattia, zemské cesty (land roads, formerly župné cesty, župa roads), príjezdné cesty (access roads), vicinální cesty (vicinal roads), cesty obecné (municipal roads and ways) and cesty interesentů (ways of interesents). 
Thus, in the Moravian-Silesian Land existed no land roads, in Slovakia and Zakarpattia were no district roads but existed a special class of "access roads", and in Bohemian and Moravia existed not a status of "public ways of interesents".

Historically, local communications is a successor term for the former obecní silnice (municipal roads) and obecní cesty (municipal ways). The terms "utilitarian communications" replaced the former term cesty interesentů or zájemnické cesty (ways of interesents) since 1961. However, in Bohemia and Moravia, public way on a private plot was concepted as a municipal way before the 1961 reform, and maintained by the municipality.

Příjezdní komunikace (access communications) to the railway stations were a special class of roads before 1938 in Slovakia nad Zakarpattia. Since 1938, access communications to railway stations, airports and ports should be built as municipal roads or district roads, as was the previous praxis in Bohemia, Moravia and Silesia. Paradoxically, the today's main access road to the main Prague airport (Václav Havel International Airport in Prague-Ruzyně) is a private property of the airport and has a status of a "utilitarian communication".

Czechoslovak act no. 147/1949 Sb. nationalized all previous státní (state), zemské (land), and okresní (district) roads and authorized the government to list other individual roads (vicinal, municipal and others) to be nationalized) or negotiate a transfer of redundant state roads to administration by municipalities. The Czechoslovak act no. 135/1961 Sb. stated a terminology and classification which is in essence continued in today's Czech Republic and Slovakia.

Poland 

Polish road categories are as follows:
 National roads (Drogi krajowe) – trunk roads, international E-road (motorways and express roads)
 Voivodeship road (Drogi wojewódzkie) – regional roads
 County roads (Drogi powiatowe)
 Communal roads (Drogi gminne) – communal/municipal roads

Portugal 

Portugal roads' categories are as follows:
 Autoestradas (A) - Motorways, most of them with tolls
 Itinerários Principais (IP) - North-south and east-west country-wide roads
 Itinerários Complementares (IC) - Roads that branch from Itinerários Principais
 Estradas Nacionais (N) - Roads used to link cities, municipal seats, and other important sites that are not linked by one of the precedent road types
 Estradas Regionais (R) - Roads linking places of interest within the region they were built in
 Estradas Municipais (M) - Roads linking different places within a município

Romania 
In Romania the roads are classified as:
 Autostrăzi (A) - Motorways
 Drumuri naționale și europene (DN, E) - National and European roads
 Drumuri naționale (DN) - National roads
 Drumuri județene (DJ) - County roads
 Drumuri comunale (DC) - Communal roads

Cyprus 
In Cyprus the roads are classified as:

 A: The motorways of Cyprus (Αυτοκινητόδρομος) are mainly 2 lanes on each side but some areas in Nicosia and Limassol have 3 lanes on each side
 B: The trunk-roads of Cyprus. These are mainly the old roads the motorways have replaces but not all of them are. These link towns together and also include some ring-roads. Most of these are single-carriageway 2 lane roads but a few of them are 4 lane dual-carriageway.
 E: These are main roads which go through multiple villages and small towns and are built similarly to B roads. A few of them can also be 4 lane dual-carriageways.
 F: The small village roads which normally only serve 1 or a few villages. These can be 2 lane roads but also a few of them are 1 lane but wide enough for 2 cars to pass
 Unclassified: The broadest type of classifications. These can be dirt-roads leading to farms and can also be dual-carriageways. The majority of them are 1 or 2 lane roads in towns or villages.

See also
Green transport hierarchy
Street hierarchy

References

External links
FHWA - Functional Classification

Road transport
Types of roads